John T. Walsh (December 21, 1898 – 1983) is a former Democratic member of the Pennsylvania House of Representatives.

References

Democratic Party members of the Pennsylvania House of Representatives
1898 births
1977 deaths
20th-century American politicians